Ramon Sadaya Fernandez (born October 3, 1953) is a Filipino former professional basketball player and current commissioner of the Philippine Sports Commission. Fernandez won four PBA Most Valuable Player awards and a record 19 PBA titles. Fernandez stood at 6'4 barefoot during his prime but due to mild gigantism grew to 6'5 during his final seasons. He scored 18,996 points to finish as the PBA's all-time scoring leader. He is also the PBA's all-time leader in rebounds, blocked shots, free throws made, playing minutes and second all-time in assists, games played and steals. He played for five teams in his entire PBA career starting with the Toyota, Manila Beer, Tanduay, Purefoods and San Miguel. Fernandez played in many international tournaments as a member of the Philippine basketball team. He is often regarded by tenured analysts as the greatest player to have ever played in the Philippine Basketball Association.

Basketball career
Fernandez graduated from University of San Carlos in Cebu. In 1972, he joined the San Miguel Braves, playing in the Manila Industrial and Commercial Athletic Association (MICAA). The following year, he transferred to the newly formed Komatsu Komets (later renamed the Toyota Comets).

He was a member of several national teams, these include the teams for the 1972 ABC Under-18 Championship, the 1973 ABC Championship, the 1974 FIBA World Championship, the 1974 Asian Games and the 1990 Asian Games.

Fernandez moved to the Philippine Basketball Association in 1975, when the Toyota Comets became one of the nine pioneer teams of the league. With his teammates, Robert Jaworski, Francis Arnáiz, Arnie Tuadles, Danny Florencio, Emerito "Emer" Legaspi and Abe King, Toyota won nine titles from 1975-1983. Fernandez was the 1982 PBA Most Valuable Player, the only time he achieved the award during his days with the fabled Toyota team.

After Toyota's disbandment in 1984, Fernandez and several former Toyota teammates joined Beer Hausen. With Toyota's disbandment, the ongoing feud between Fernandez and Jaworski became public. Fernandez won the 1984 MVP award, his second, during his first season with the Lucio Tan-owned franchise, but never led the team to the championship until he was shipped in the middle of the 1985 season to Tanduay for Abet Guidaben.

From 1986-1987, Fernandez along with former Crispa rivals Freddie Hubalde and Padim Israel, J.B. Yango, Willie Generalao, Onchie dela Cruz and imports Rob Williams, Andre McKoy and later, David Thirdkill, led the Rhum Masters to three PBA titles. Fernandez won his third MVP award in 1986.

Tanduay would disband before the 1988 season, but the franchise rights were bought by the Purefoods. Fernandez would become playing coach, his first coaching stint, of a young team composed of Jerry Codiñera, Jojo Lastimosa, Al Solís, Glenn Capacio and later Alvin Patrimonio. In the 1988 Open Conference, he led his new team to a runner-up finish to San Miguel Beer. However, midway through the All-Filipino Conference, he would relinquish his coaching duties to his assistant, Cris Calilan, to concentrate on his game. But in a controversial move, Fernandez was benched during the Finals against Añejo Rhum. The said event led to his transfer to San Miguel Beer in exchange for, the second time, Abet Guidaben. Fernandez would later lead the Beermen to the 1988 Reinforced Conference Championship and also won his fourth MVP Award, becoming the first and the only player to win four MVP awards with four teams.

Fernandez was a vital cog in San Miguel's historic grand slam run in 1989, while making amends with rival Jaworski during the All-Star Game of the same season, when El Presidente scored an under goal stab off a Jaworski inbound pass at half court, to lead the Veterans to a 132-130 win over the Rookie-Sophomores team. Legendary coach Baby Dalupan, then coaching the Veterans, summoned both players to a historic handshake at centercourt signaling the end of their bitter feud.  However, despite leading his team to the "triple crown" that season, Fernandez narrowly lost to rookie Benjie Paras in the MVP balloting, denying the then 36-year old veteran a fifth MVP plum.

In 1990, Fernandez was a member of the Philippine basketball team that won a silver medal in the Beijing Asian Games. He was supposed to participate in the 1994 Asian Games team, but begged off due to an injury. That year also saw the final season of Fernandez's PBA career when he announced his retirement.

In 1984, Fernandez was five assists away from averaging in triple-double the whole season. He ended his PBA career as the all-time leader in most points scored with 18,996, second in assists with 5,220, first in defensive rebounds with 6,435, second in offensive rebounds behind Guidaben with 2,217, first in overall rebounds with 8,652, first in minutes played with 36624:30, second in games played, first in blocks with 1,853, and second in steals with 1,302 (first at retirement in 1994). He ended with career averages of 17.7 points per game, 8.1 rebounds per game, 4.9 assists per game, 1.2 steals per game, and 1.7 blocks per game in 1,074 games.

Post-PBA career

After his playing career, Fernandez ran for a senatorial seat under the Nationalist People's Coalition in the 1995 elections but lost. In 1998, he became the first commissioner of the defunct professional league, Metropolitan Basketball Association.

In 2000, he was included in the PBA's 25 Greatest Players' list and was awarded during the league's anniversary on April 9, 2000.

In 2003, Fernandez was named the Commissioner of the Collegiate Champions League tournament. A few months earlier, Fernandez was part of the Toyota Tamaraws in the Crispa-Toyota Reunion Game. The highlight of the event was the kick out pass of Fernandez to Jaworski, who sank a three-pointer to seal the Tamaraws' 65–61 win over their bitter rivals, the Redmanizers.

He also became the Commissioner of the now-inactive United Regional Basketball League during its only run in 2004.

Fernandez was also inducted in the PBA Hall of Fame and participated in the Greatest Game, a reunion of several members of the league's 25 Greatest Players, on May 30, 2005 when they lost to the TM Greats team, 96–92.

He also ventured in several business opportunities and is currently based in Cebu, managing his flourishing "Suka ni El Presidente" brand of bottled spiced vinegar.

In 2016, Fernandez was appointed as one of the four commissioners of the Philippine Sports Commission.

In 2018, Fernandez was appointed to the Board of Directors for UGE Philippines, a local leader in solar energy solutions for the commercial and industrial sector - a subsidiary of UGE International. He first became involved with UGE in 2015 due to an interest in renewable energy advocacy.

Fernandez became Officer in Charge of the Philippine Sports Commission in lieu of Chairperson Butch Ramirez. Ramirez went on leave until July 20 to attend to his sick wife.

Gigantism
In a September 2015 interview, Fernandez revealed that he has a mild case of gigantism after discovering he has recently grown to 6'7". During his PBA career, his listed height was only between 6'4" and 6'5".

Legacy
Fernandez is remembered as one of the most popular players during the PBA's golden years and is also one of the most prominent faces in Philippine basketball, even to this day. He remains the poster-boy of many a PBA Legends Reunion game in the country and abroad.

Fernandez could actually play all five positions on the basketball court, having mastered the skills needed as a point guard, off-guard, forward, power-forward and center. He is known for his dribbling skills (unusual for a center during his era), uncanny passing ability, perimeter jumpers, and unstoppable high or low post moves. In an open court game, it was not unusual to see him, after collaring a rebound, dribble down the full length of the court and finish off a fastbreak with a lay-up from the middle or a fancy pass to a streaking teammate on the wings. The fact that he could dribble the ball so well came about as a result of him playing point-guard in high school when he was still too short to play the center slot. He is also well known for his trademark one handed running shot dubbed as "the elegant shot." He could play facing the basket or with his back to it. Major distinguishing aspects of his game which showed a level of skill unmatched in Philippine basketball before or since, was his ability to improvise his own shots, create the necessary space for a play and drive towards the basket at will during a half-court game. This was remarkable because centers and power-forwards even in today's brand of basketball usually play near or underneath the basket and often rely on specifically designed plays involving their teammates.

Fernandez is perhaps the most ambidextrous player to have played the game since Carlos Loyzaga a generation before him. Almost always, whenever he would get the defensive rebound he would assume the role of "point-center", leading the fast-break (a throwback to his point-guard days), which he admitted was a habit he could not break in the pros. Fernandez would dribble the ball running the middle of the court, either hitting the open man on either wing or finishing a lay-up with either hand. There were many instances when he would switch the ball from right hand to left hand, often drawing a foul or setting up a three-point play. One of his more famous moves was the "kili-kili" (armpit) shot, which he set up by driving down the middle of the lane coming from the right side of the court, faking a right-handed shot and then, at the last second when the defender has committed himself, switching the ball to his left hand for a scoop shot under the armpit of the same defender that almost always drew a foul. He had an ambidextrous hook shot that was almost impossible to stop and a weird-looking variation of a lay-up that was executed while "fading away" from the basket which made it equally intriguing. His "elegant shot" often came after a right-handed cross-over dribble and moving away from a defender. He used pivot moves, pump fakes, lookaway or no-look passes, looping shots, fadeaways and an array of what seemed to be trick shots from near or under the basket that he executed to perfection. He was doing this before Kevin McHale was doing his moves worthy of a chapter in an NBA playbook. Fernandez owned what was perhaps the craziest no-look pass that was executed on Philippine hardwood: an assist initiated as a fake behind-the-back pass going to one direction only to go the opposite direction at the precise moment when the recipient is ready to receive the pass. He did this in front of a capacity crowd on May 30, 2003 during the Crispa Redmanizers vs. Toyota Super Corollas Reunion game at the Smart Araneta Coliseum. With Toyota up 37-29, Fernandez intercepted a pass from Bernie Fabiosa underneath the Crispa basket, dribbled with his left hand, crossed-over a defending Atoy Co, brought the ball down the full length of the court with his right hand and just after entering Toyota's shaded lane shovelled the no-look pass to teammate Rolly Marcelo on the right side for an unmolested layup. Broadcaster Dick Ildefonso who was calling the game that night along with Emy Arcilla described it on air as "a pass that nobody saw except the receiver". His pinpoint passing ability was so devastating to opponents because he often executed them at critical junctures of the game, either coming from his right or left hand. It didn't matter to Fernandez whether he was hitting the open man through a crowd of defenders or hitting the same open man via a Hail Mary pass from outside the backcourt. Philip Cezar and Abe King, two premier defenders of local players and imports alike, in television interviews, always said that Fernandez was the toughest assignment they ever had to handle.

Fernandez was also one of the least athletic players to have laced on a pair of sneakers in the history of the PBA. He was too thin for a center who had to go up against imports who usually had more muscle and speed than he did. To be sure, there were many other players in his era who were a lot stronger than him. In addition, he did not possess a high vertical leap, rarely doing a slam-dunk during a career that spanned about twenty years. But these limitations were offset by the fact that he had an array of astonishing skills, a basketball IQ that was off the charts and mental toughness that enabled him to impose his will against opponents. Case in point: Fernandez, even on a bad night, could still cut down an opponent, by baiting him into senseless fouls or getting him to react in an unsportsmanlike manner to many pre-designed tirades. One broadsheet called him, upon his retirement, as the man "who could control every variable of the game".

His MVP-stats in the 1984 season of the PBA, where he averaged in double figures in almost all of the major statistical categories (points, rebounds, assists), turning in an incredible 27 point-15 rebound-9.9 assist performance (an almost a triple-double season), may never be matched as it stands as perhaps the most dominating individual performance in the history of Philippine professional basketball.

Basketball achievements

PBA
4-time Most Valuable Player (1982, 1984, 1986, 1988)
PBA Hall of Fame
Member of the 1989 San Miguel Grand Slam Team
13-time Mythical First Team Selection (1976, 1977, 1978, 1979, 1980, 1981, 1982, 1984, 1986, 1988, 1989, 1991, 1992)
3-time Mythical Second Team Selection (1985, 1987, and 1990)
6-time PBA All-Star
Member of PBA's 25 Greatest Players
Member of PBA's 40 Greatest Players
PBA Hall of Fame Class of 2005

Others
Member, 1972 Asian Youth, Manila, Philippines
Member, 1973 Asian Basketball Confederation, Manila. (ABC-NOW FIBA ASIA)
Member, 1974 Mundo Basket, San Juan, Puerto Rico(World Basketball Championship)
Member, 1974 Asian Games, Tehran, Iran
Member, 1990 Asian Games, Beijing, China
1994 Asian Games Assistant Coach
Metropolitan Basketball Association Commissioner 1998-1999

PBA career statistics

|-
| align="left" | 1975
| align="left" | Toyota
| 56 || 31.43 || .428 || .000 || .787 || 8.64 || 3.77 || 1.13 || 2.38 || 13.16
|-
| align="left" | 1976
| align="left" | Toyota
| 58 || 30.93 || .469 || .000 || .625 || 8.45 || 3.41 || 1.57 || 2.26 || 16.17
|-
| align="left" | 1977
| align="left" | Toyota
| 53 || 32.83 || .480 || .000 || .652 || 6.91 || 3.17 || 1.43 || 2.47 || 18.23
|-
| align="left" | 1978
| align="left" | Toyota
| 54 || 36.0 || .502 || .000 || .792 || 9.7 || 4.28 || 1.87 || 2.46 || 20.65
|-
| align="left" | 1979
| align="left" | Toyota
| 53 || 33.0 || .494 || .000 || .783 || 9.36 || 4.04 || 1.38 || 2.51 || 18.85
|-
| align="left" | 1980
| align="left" | Toyota
| 53 || 32.55 || .487 || .375 || .728 || 8.83 || 3.70 || 1.45 || 1.79 || 15.85
|-
| align="left" | 1981
| align="left" | Toyota
| 43 || 33.7 || .488 || .000 || .803 || 8.05 || 4.14 || 1.26 || 1.74 || 19.65
|-
| align="left" | 1982
| align="left" | Toyota
| 67 || 36.97 || .486 || .177 || .739 || 8.01 || 5.16 || 1.27 || 1.61 || 20.31
|-
| align="left" | 1983
| align="left" | Toyota
| 38 || 37.32 || .524 || .077 || .791 || 10.95 || 5.71 || 1.29 || 1.89 || 24.16
|-
| align="left" | 1984
| align="left" | Beer Hausen
| 64 || 40.8 || .525 || .000 || .808 || 11.17 || 9.92 || 1.53 || 2.09 || 27.80
|-
| align="left" | 1985
| align="left" | Manila Beer
| 30 || 38.67 || .469 || .000 || .706 || 8.97 || 6.50 || 1.17 || 1.13 || 19.07
|-
| align="left" | 1985
| align="left" | Tanduay
| 7 || 42.14 || .583|| .000 || .778 || 8.14 || 6.57 || 1.57 || 1.57 || 22.14
|-
| align="left" | 1985
| align="left" | Manila Beer / Tanduay (Combined)
| 37 || 39.32 || .490 || .000 || .720 || 8.81 || 6.51 || 1.24 || 1.22 || 19.65
|-
| align="left" | 1986
| align="left" | Tanduay
| 62 || 39.19 || .451 || .000 || .707 || 9.92 || 5.77 || 1.27 || 2.35 || 18.32
|-
| align="left" | 1987
| align="left" | Tanduay
|  ||  ||  ||  ||  ||  ||  ||  ||  || 
|-
| align="left" | 1988
| align="left" | Purefoods
|  ||  ||  ||  ||  ||  ||  ||  ||  || 
|-
| align="left" | 1988
| align="left" | San Miguel Beer
|  ||  ||  ||  ||  ||  ||  ||  ||  || 
|-
| align="left" | 1988
| align="left" | Purefoods / San Miguel (Combined)
|  ||  ||  ||  ||  ||  ||  ||  ||  || 
|-
| align="left" | 1989
| align="left" | San Miguel Beer
|  ||  ||  ||  ||  ||  ||  ||  ||  || 
|-
| align="left" | 1990
| align="left" | San Miguel Beer
|  ||  ||  ||  ||  ||  ||  ||  ||  || 
|-
| align="left" | 1991
| align="left" | San Miguel Beer
| 64 || 37.33 ||  ||  ||  ||  ||  || 1.16 ||  || 
|-
| align="left" | 1992
| align="left" | San Miguel Beer
|  ||  ||  ||  ||  ||  ||  ||  ||  || 
|-
| align="left" | 1993
| align="left" | San Miguel Beer
|  ||  ||  ||  ||  ||  ||  ||  ||  || 
|-
| align="left" | 1994
| align="left" | San Miguel Beer
|  ||  ||  ||  ||  ||  ||  ||  ||  || 
|-
| align="left" | Career
| align="left" |
| 1074 || 33.73 ||  ||  || .768 || 8.06 || 4.86 || 1.21 || 1.73 || 17.69

Coaching career

PBA

References

External links

1953 births
Living people
Asian Games medalists in basketball
Asian Games silver medalists for the Philippines
Basketball players at the 1974 Asian Games
Basketball players at the 1990 Asian Games
Basketball players from Southern Leyte
Centers (basketball)
Filipino men's basketball coaches
Magnolia Hotshots players
Manila Beer Brewmasters players
Medalists at the 1990 Asian Games
Metropolitan Basketball Association executives
Nationalist People's Coalition politicians
People from Cebu
People from Southern Leyte
Filipino people of Spanish descent
Philippine Basketball Association All-Stars
Magnolia Hotshots coaches
Philippine Basketball Association players with retired numbers
Philippines men's national basketball team players
Filipino men's basketball players
1974 FIBA World Championship players
San Miguel Beermen players
Tanduay Rhum Masters players
Toyota Super Corollas players
USC Warriors basketball players